Shakhovka is a rural locality (a khutor) in Volokonovsky District, Belgorod Oblast, Russia. The population was 275 as of 2010. There are 4 streets.

Geography 
Shakhovka is located 31 km southwest of Volokonovka (the district's administrative centre) by road. Bochanka is the nearest rural locality.

References 

Rural localities in Volokonovsky District